Chindro (also known as Stapoo or Kidi Kada) is a popular rural game of Indian Sub-Continent. The game is played with a stone that tossed and slid on a marked off playing court. It is similar to hopscotch.

Description 
Chindro is game popular in Indian Sub-Continent. Though mostly considered a rural game, it is frequently played in many urban areas as well. Primarily it is a favorite pastime of small and teenage girls, but young boys too can take part in it.

Equipment and setup

Most of the time an empty small tin box of a shoe polish is filled with sand and is used as the playing object.

One of the participants draws a playing court on a flat surface (usually the floor of alleys) with the help of a piece of coal or chalk. The size of the court depends upon the wishes of the participants and may thus vary greatly. For example, if all the participants agree to have a court of eight boxes  each, then that constitutes the playing court.

Gameplay

Once the playing court is drawn, each participant takes turns. Initially, the player stands backwards at one side of the court and throws the stone blindly over her head so that it may land inside the farthest box of the court. If it lands successfully inside the designated box (without touching any lines) of the court, the player takes off her shoes and stands barefoot near that piece of stone with one foot in the air. Afterwards, she pushes the stone (in a single try) to attempt to slide it into the adjoining box. If successful (once again without touching any of the lines), then the player carries on doing the same until the piece of stone is successfully out of the court and the player is back at the place from where she threw the stone. Once successfully out of the court, the player may stand on both feet.

Consequently, the player's turn prematurely ends when:
The player can no longer stand on one foot and both feet touch the court area, or
The stone stops on one of the lines, or
The stone slides out of the court before it reaches the last box.

Taliban ban

During the Taliban's rule, many sports for girls were banned in Afghanistan, including Chindro.

See also 

 Paandi

References 

Children's games
Girls' toys and games
Indian games